This is  list of Mars analogs, which simulate aspects of the conditions human beings could experience during a future mission to Mars, or different aspects of Mars such as its materials or conditions. This is often used for testing aspects of spacecraft missions to that planet. For example, Mars regolith has been attempted to be replicated by Mars regolith simulant.

Crew analog experiments

Some examples of analog tests with people include NASA conducting a 120-day study in Hawaii to test a space food diet (HI-SEAS), and equipment tests inside Austrian mountain caves in 2012. A future Mars base has been compared to the  Amundsen-Scott South Pole Station in Antarctica, because relatively small groups must survive in extreme conditions there.

Mars analogs are sometimes chosen for their location, for example, Devon Island is at 75°N latitude which provides solar radiance similar to the Martian Equator. Similarly, high altitudes can provide an equivalent to the low pressure of the Mars atmosphere.

Among these are:
Mars-500, simulated a 520-day mission in Moscow.
Mars Analogue Research Station Program, simulated Mars habitats
Flashline Mars Arctic Research Station
Mars Desert Research Station
European Mars Analog Research Station
Australia Mars Analog Research Station
Arctic Mars Analog Svalbard Expedition, annual expeditions to remote sites
Concordia Station, multi-purpose Antarctic base
HI-SEAS, crewed tests in Hawaiian mountains.
NEEMO, underwater base,
D-MARS, Israeli mission,
LunAres Research Station, European habitat in Poland.
Solar54, Argentina Mars Analog Base project
Astroland Agency, Spanish Mars Analog Habitat 

Pressure

At about 28 miles (45 km,  150 thousand feet ) Earth altitude the pressure starts to be equivalent to Mars surface pressure. However, the major component of Mars air, CO2 gas, is denser than Earth air for a given pressure. Perhaps more significantly there is no land at this altitude on earth. The highest point on earth is the summit of Mount Everest at about 5.5 miles (8.8 km,  29 thousand feet), where the pressure is about fifty times greater than on the surface of Mars. The correct atmospheric pressure can be created by a vacuum chamber. NASA's Space Power Facility was used to test the airbag landing systems for the Mars Pathfinder and the Mars Exploration Rovers, Spirit and Opportunity, under simulated Mars atmospheric conditions.

Gravity
The gravity of Mars is about 38% of Earth's gravity at the surface, about 3.7 metres per second2. This can be simulated for short time by an aircraft following a flight profile that causes this type of acceleration. This technique (using a variation on free-fall) has allowed the gait of people in Mars gravity to be studied.

20th century
The Russians conducted the BIOS-3 study in the 60s and 70s which had 315 cubic metres of space, and a later confinement study was Mars 500.

See also 

 Mars analog habitat
 :Category:Human analog missions
 Research stations in Antarctica
 Space station
 Timeline of longest spaceflights
Martian meteorite
Mars habitat

References 

Human analog missions
Mars